Charles Mathias Édouard Simonis (21 September 1818 – 1 November 1875) was a Luxembourgian politician and jurist.  Simonis was Mayor of Luxembourg City from 1873 until his premature death, in 1875.  He also sat in the Chamber of Deputies.  In the Chamber, he was notable for his leadership of the campaign against the creation of a National Bank, which he maintained until his death.  Simonis was one of 26 subscribers, along with various other notable liberal politicians, to the Companie des Hauts Fourneaux Luxembourgeois.

Simonis was a member of the communal council of Luxembourg City, before becoming an échevin on 22 December 1854.

Footnotes

References
 
 
 

Mayors of Luxembourg City
Members of the Chamber of Deputies (Luxembourg)
Councillors in Luxembourg City
Luxembourgian jurists
1818 births
1875 deaths
People from Luxembourg City